A special election for Ilocos Sur's 1st district seat in the House of Representatives of the Philippines was held on May 28, 2011. The special election was called after incumbent representative Ronald Singson resigned on March 7, 2011 after being convicted of drug possession by the Wan Chai District Court in Hong Kong. Vigan vice mayor Ryan Luis Singson, the former representative's brother, won the election and shall serve the remainder of his brother's term which will end on June 30, 2013.

Background
Incumbent representative Ronald Singson of Lakas-Kampi-CMD won the general election on May 10, 2010. His term began on June 30, but he was arrested in Hong Kong on July 11, a few days before the 15th Congress convened, for trafficking of illegal drugs. Singson was convicted on a lesser charge of drug possession on February 25, 2011, and resigned the next month, which was accepted by the Speaker Feliciano Belmonte, Jr.

The Commission on Elections set the election on May 28, 2011, Saturday. The period for the filing of certificates of candidacy was from May 9 to 13, and the campaign period would be from May 14 to 26. Unlike the general election, the special election will be conducted manually.

Campaign

Initial speculation on the candidates centered on incumbent governor and Ronald's father Chavit Singson and his political opponent Efren Rafanan of the Pwersa ng Masang Pilipino (PMP) as the elder Singson defeated Rafanan in the 2010 gubernatorial election. President Benigno Aquino III's Liberal Party screened potential candidates as Trandy Baterina, the younger Singson's congressional opponent in 2010 was no longer interested in running. Meanwhile, Singson's local party Biled selected Vigan vice mayor Ryan Singson, Chavit's son and Ronald's brother as their candidate. On mid-May, Baterina filed his certificate of candidacy as the Liberal Party's candidate, accompanied by his father Ben, and Rafanan.

The Liberal Party was split in the election: the Liberals endorsed Baterina, but their Ilocos Sur chair, Francisco Ranches, Jr., personally backed Singson; he added that Baterina would be running as an independent candidate as the party nomination was not submitted to the commission on time. Rafanan, Baterina's campaign manager, countered that they got the party nomination and submitted it to the commission on time. At the eve of the election, both candidates' campaigns claim they have the endorsement of the Liberal Party.

Results
Note: Change for Ryan Singson (Biled) is compared from Ronald Singson's (Lakas-Kampi) votes in 2010.

 
 
 
 
 
 

The Parish Pastoral Council for Responsible Voting (PPCRV) reported that the election was peaceful but there were reports of rampant vote-buying and barangay officials were entering the polling precincts. The PPCRV reported that the reason for the peacefulness was that the people already knew who will win, while refusing to name which campaign was buying votes. Chairman Sixto Brillantes, whose commission targeted an election turnout between 55 to 60%, was worried on the turnout, but noted that the election was honest and orderly. Initial figures pointed to a turnout of between 55 and 65%; the low turnout was blamed on the number of disputed posts (1), as opposed in a general election where families voted together. Another reason was that voters had not been given "incentives" to vote, such as free gasoline.

Meanwhile, the National Citizen's Movement for Free Elections (NAMFREL) reported inclement weather as a reason behind low voter turnout. NAMFREL also noted rampant vote buying, citing observations from its volunteers in Vigan that barangay representatives, supposedly non-partisan, were handing cash in exchange for votes, with ₱3,000 being given to barangay captains, ₱2000 to kagawads, and, ₱250 to heads of families, calling such as money-politics and condemning it. After the conduct of the special polls, NAMFREL also released a parallel count with Singson in the lead.

The Ilocos Sur Provincial Board of Canvassers proclaimed Singson as the winner on May 29. Singson credited his party's machinery and his party mates for the victory; the position of vice mayor of Vigan will be taken over by Lourdes Baquiran, the councilor with the most votes in the 2010 city council election, with the vacancy on the council to be filled by someone from their party. The turnout was described as "good" by the city election officer, noting that only 60% of the voters generally cast their votes in special elections. 

Representative-elect Singson was sworn into office on May 30 at the House of Representatives o.with his family and Manny Pacquiao with him at the rostrum. Singson said that they have no national political affiliation yet.

2010 election result

See also
1913 Ilocos Sur's 1st legislative district special election

References

External links
COMELEC Resolution No. 9169

2011 elections in the Philippines
Special elections to the Congress of the Philippines
Politics of Ilocos Sur